The 2006 European Curling Championships were held December 9–16, 2006 at the St. Jakobshalle in Basel, Switzerland.

Men Division A

Teams

Standings

A tournament

Final round-robin standings

Session 1
December 9, 2006

Session 2
December 9, 2006

Session 3
December 10, 2006

Session 4
December 11, 2006

Session 5
December 11, 2006

Session 6
December 12, 2006

Session 7
December 12, 2006

Session 8
December 13, 2006

Session 9
December 14, 2006

Tie-breakers
December 14, 2006

Play-off
December 15, 2006

Semi final
December 15, 2006

Final
December 16, 2006

Men Division B

Teams Group 1

Standings

Teams Group 2

Standings

Tie-breakers
December 13–14, 2006

Play-off
December 14, 2006

Semi final
December 15, 2006

Final
December 15, 2006

World Cup Challenge
December 16, 2006

Women Division A

Teams

Standings

Results

Session 1
December 9, 2006

Session 2
December 9, 2006

Session 3
December 10, 2006

Session 4
December 10, 2006

Session 5
December 11, 2006

Session 6
December 11, 2006

Session 7
December 12, 2006

Session 8
December 13, 2006

Session 9
December 13, 2006

Tie-breakers
December 14, 2006

Play-off
December 15, 2006

Semi final
December 15, 2006

Final
December 16, 2006

Women Division B

Teams

Standings Group 1

Standings Group 2

Tie-breakers
December 13, 2006

Play-off
December 14, 2006

Semi final
December 15, 2006

Final
December 15, 2006

References

European Curling Championship
European Curling Championships
Sports competitions in Basel
International sports competitions hosted by Switzerland
European Curling Championships, 2006
Curling competitions in Switzerland
2006 in European sport
December 2006 sports events in Europe